Serge Gut (25 June 1927 – 31 March 2014 on ResMusica) was a French musicologist of Swiss origin.

Biography 
A pupil of Simone Plé-Caussade, Tony Aubin and Olivier Messiaen at the Conservatoire de Paris, of Solange Corbin and Jacques Chailley at the Sorbonne, emeritus professor at the Paris-Sorbonne a composer, Serge Gut was a specialist of Franz Liszt. He was also a great specialist in German and French music of the 19th and early 20th century, the theory of musical language and its evolution.

Selected publications 
 1967: La tierce harmonique dans la musique occidentale.
 1989: Franz Liszt (Fallois, l'Âge d'homme, 1989, translated into German and expanded in 2009.
 1975: Franz Liszt : les éléments du langage musical. (Klinsksieck, 1975, reissued in a revised and expanded version in 2008 at Éditions Aug. Zurfluh)
 1993: Correspondence Liszt-d'Agoult (Fayard)
 1994: Aspects du Lied romantique allemand. (Actes Sud)
 1998: Collection of articles Musicologie au fil des siècles (PUPS), which is the tribute of Paris-Sorbonne University to the person who directed the UFR in music and musicology from 1983 to 1990.
2014: Tristan et Isolde, Fayard, Paris, .
2018: Les principes fondamentaux de la musique occidentale, Beauchesne, Paris, .

References

External links 
 Serge Gut on IdRef
 Serge Gut on Symétrie
 Direction of theses on Theses.fr

20th-century French musicologists
Academic staff of the University of Paris
People from Basel-Stadt
1927 births
2014 deaths
Swiss emigrants to France